Tiémala-Banimonotié is a rural commune in the Cercle of Bougouni in the Sikasso Region of southern Mali. The main village (chef-lieu) is Kologo.

References

External links
.

Communes of Sikasso Region